Henrik Olof Vinge (born 10 August 1988) is a Swedish politician of the Sweden Democrats. He has served as Leader of the Sweden Democrats in the Riksdag and as first deputy leader of his party since November 2019.

Vinge has a law degree from Stockholm University. He has previously worked as a prison guard at the Swedish Prison and Probation Service, as a recruitment consultant and a legal advisor for the non-profit online service Lawline. In 2014, he started the company called Näthatjuristerna, which specializes in investigating criminal violations on the internet.

He became a press manager for the Sweden Democrats in March 2015 and was appointed integration policy spokesperson for the party in August 2018. Vinge has been Member of the Riksdag for Stockholm Municipality since September 2018.

He married 2017 Stockholm Ungsvenskarna politician Linnéa Vinge, formerly Cortés.

References

External links 

 Henrik Vinge at the Riksdag 

1988 births
Living people
Members of the Riksdag 2018–2022
Members of the Riksdag 2022–2026
People from Järfälla Municipality
Stockholm University alumni
21st-century Swedish politicians
Members of the Riksdag from the Sweden Democrats